A World of His Own is a British comedy television series which aired on the BBC in 13 episodes between 31 July 1964 and 26 February 1965. It was created as a vehicle for Roy Kinnear, who played an absent-minded dreamer. Anne Cunningham co-starred alongside him as his wife.

Other actors who appeared in the series include Deryck Guyler, Sydney Tafler, John Junkin, Penny Morrell, Julian Orchard, Kenneth Cope and Arthur Mullard.

References

Bibliography
 Horace Newcomb. Encyclopedia of Television. Routledge, 2014.

External links
 

BBC television sitcoms
1964 British television series debuts
1965 British television series endings
1960s British comedy television series
English-language television shows